Sugar is the generic name for sweet-tasting, soluble carbohydrates, many of which are used in food. Simple sugars, also called monosaccharides, include glucose, fructose, and galactose. Compound sugars, also called disaccharides or double sugars, are molecules made of two bonded monosaccharides; common examples are sucrose (glucose + fructose), lactose (glucose + galactose), and maltose (two molecules of glucose). White sugar is a refined form of sucrose. In the body, compound sugars are hydrolysed into simple sugars.

Longer chains of monosaccharides (>2) are not regarded as sugars, and are called oligosaccharides or polysaccharides. Starch is a glucose polymer found in plants, the most abundant source of energy in human food. Some other chemical substances, such as glycerol and sugar alcohols, may have a sweet taste, but are not classified as sugar.

Sugars are found in the tissues of most plants. Honey and fruits are abundant natural sources of simple sugars. Sucrose is especially concentrated in sugarcane and sugar beet, making them ideal for efficient commercial extraction to make refined sugar. In 2016, the combined world production of those two crops was about two billion tonnes. Maltose may be produced by malting grain. Lactose is the only sugar that cannot be extracted from plants. It can only be found in milk, including human breast milk, and in some dairy products. A cheap source of sugar is corn syrup, industrially produced by converting corn starch into sugars, such as maltose, fructose and glucose.

Sucrose is used in prepared foods (e.g. cookies and cakes), is sometimes added to commercially available processed food and beverages, and may be used by people as a sweetener for foods (e.g. toast and cereal) and beverages (e.g. coffee and tea).

As sugar consumption grew in the latter part of the 20th century, researchers began to examine whether a diet high in sugar, especially refined sugar, was damaging to human health. Excessive consumption of sugar has been implicated in the onset of obesity, diabetes, cardiovascular disease, and tooth decay. Numerous studies have tried to clarify those implications, but with varying results, mainly because of the difficulty of finding populations for use as controls that consume little or no sugar. In 2015, the World Health Organization strongly recommended that adults and children reduce their intake of free sugars to less than 10%, and encouraged a reduction to below 5%, of their total energy intake.

Etymology
The etymology reflects the spread of the commodity. From Sanskrit (śarkarā), meaning "ground or candied sugar", came Persian shakar, then to 12th century French sucre and the English sugar.

The English word jaggery, a coarse brown sugar made from date palm sap or sugarcane juice, has a similar etymological origin: Portuguese jágara from the Malayalam cakkarā, which is from the Sanskrit śarkarā.

History

Ancient world to Renaissance

Asia
Sugar has been produced in the Indian subcontinent since ancient times and its cultivation spread from there into modern-day Afghanistan through the Khyber Pass. It was not plentiful or cheap in early times, and in most parts of the world, honey was more often used for sweetening. Originally, people chewed raw sugarcane to extract its sweetness. Even after refined sugarcane became more widely available during the European colonial era, palm sugar was preferred in Java and other sugar producing parts of southeast Asia, and along with coconut sugar, is still used locally to make desserts today.

Sugarcane is native of tropical areas such as the Indian subcontinent (South Asia) and Southeast Asia. Different species seem to have originated from different locations with Saccharum barberi originating in India and S. edule and S. officinarum coming from New Guinea. One of the earliest historical references to sugarcane is in Chinese manuscripts dating to 8th century BCE, which state that the use of sugarcane originated in India.

In the tradition of Indian medicine (āyurveda), the sugarcane is known by the name Ikṣu and the sugarcane juice is known as Phāṇita. Its varieties, synonyms and characteristics are defined in nighaṇṭus such as the Bhāvaprakāśa (1.6.23, group of sugarcanes).
Sugar remained relatively unimportant until the Indians discovered methods of turning sugarcane juice into granulated crystals that were easier to store and to transport. Crystallized sugar was discovered by the time of the Imperial Guptas, around the 5th century CE. In the local Indian language, these crystals were called khanda (Devanagari: खण्ड), which is the source of the word candy. Indian sailors, who carried clarified butter and sugar as supplies, introduced knowledge of sugar along the various trade routes they travelled. Traveling Buddhist monks took sugar crystallization methods to China. During the reign of Harsha (r. 606–647) in North India, Indian envoys in Tang China taught methods of cultivating sugarcane after Emperor Taizong of Tang (r. 626–649) made known his interest in sugar. China established its first sugarcane plantations in the seventh century. Chinese documents confirm at least two missions to India, initiated in 647 CE, to obtain technology for sugar refining. In the Indian subcontinent, the Middle East and China, sugar became a staple of cooking and desserts.

Europe

Nearchus, admiral of Alexander of Macedonia, knew of sugar during the year 325 BC, because of his participation in the campaign of India led by Alexander (Arrian, Anabasis). The Greek physician Pedanius Dioscorides in the 1st century CE described sugar in his medical treatise De Materia Medica, and Pliny the Elder, a 1st-century CE Roman, described sugar in his Natural History: "Sugar is made in Arabia as well, but Indian sugar is better. It is a kind of honey found in cane, white as gum, and it crunches between the teeth. It comes in lumps the size of a hazelnut. Sugar is used only for medical purposes." Crusaders brought sugar back to Europe after their campaigns in the Holy Land, where they encountered caravans carrying "sweet salt". Early in the 12th century, Venice acquired some villages near Tyre and set up estates to produce sugar for export to Europe. It supplemented the use of honey, which had previously been the only available sweetener. Crusade chronicler William of Tyre, writing in the late 12th century, described sugar as "very necessary for the use and health of mankind". In the 15th century, Venice was the chief sugar refining and distribution center in Europe.

There was a drastic change in the mid-15th century, when Madeira and the Canary Islands were settled from Europe and sugar introduced there. After this an "all-consuming passion for sugar ... swept through society" as it became far more easily available, though initially still very expensive. Genoa, one of the centers of distribution, became known for candied fruit, while Venice specialized in pastries, sweets (candies), and sugar sculptures. Sugar was considered to have "valuable medicinal properties" as a "warm" food under prevailing categories, being "helpful to the stomach, to cure cold diseases, and sooth lung complaints".

A feast given in Tours in 1457 by Gaston de Foix, which is "probably the best and most complete account we have of a late medieval banquet" includes the first mention of sugar sculptures, as the final food brought in was "a heraldic menagerie sculpted in sugar: lions, stags, monkeys ... each holding in paw or beak the arms of the Hungarian king".  Other recorded grand feasts in the decades following included similar pieces.  Originally the sculptures seem to have been eaten in the meal, but later they become merely table decorations, the most elaborate called triomfi. Several significant sculptors are known to have produced them; in some cases their preliminary drawings survive. Early ones were in brown sugar, partly cast in molds, with the final touches carved. They continued to be used until at least the Coronation Banquet for Edward VII of the United Kingdom in 1903; among other sculptures every guest was given a sugar crown to take away.

Modern history

In August 1492, Christopher Columbus collected sugar cane samples in La Gomera in the Canary Islands, and introduced it to the New World. The cuttings were planted and the first sugar-cane harvest in Hispaniola took place in 1501. Many sugar mills had been constructed in Cuba and Jamaica by the 1520s. The Portuguese took sugar cane to Brazil. By 1540, there were 800 cane-sugar mills in Santa Catarina Island and another 2,000 on the north coast of Brazil, Demarara, and Surinam. It took until 1600 for Brazilian sugar production to exceed that of São Tomé, which was the main center of sugar production in sixteenth century.

Sugar was a luxury in Europe until the early 19th century, when it became more widely available, due to the rise of beet sugar in Prussia, and later in France under Napoleon. Beet sugar was a German invention, since, in 1747, Andreas Sigismund Marggraf announced the discovery of sugar in beets and devised a method using alcohol to extract it. Marggraf's student, Franz Karl Achard, devised an economical industrial method to extract the sugar in its pure form in the late 18th century. Achard first produced beet sugar in 1783 in Kaulsdorf, and in 1801, the world's first beet sugar production facility was established in Cunern, Silesia (then part of Prussia, now Poland). The works of Marggraf and Achard were the starting point for the sugar industry in Europe, and for the modern sugar industry in general, since sugar was no longer a luxury product and a product almost only produced in warmer climates.

Sugar became highly popular and by the 19th century, was found in every household. This evolution of taste and demand for sugar as an essential food ingredient resulted in major economic and social changes. Demand drove, in part, the colonization of tropical islands and areas where labor-intensive sugarcane plantations and sugar manufacturing facilities could be successful. World consumption increased more than 100 times from 1850 to 2000, led by Britain, where it increased from about 2 pounds per head per year in 1650 to 90 pounds by the early 20th century. In the late 18th century Britain consumed about half the sugar which reached Europe.

After slavery was abolished, the demand for workers in European colonies in the Caribbean was filled by indentured laborers from the Indian subcontinent. Millions of enslaved or indentured laborers were brought to various European colonies in the Americas, Africa and Asia (as a result of demand in Europe for among other commodities, sugar), influencing the ethnic mixture of numerous nations around the globe.

Sugar also led to some industrialization of areas where sugar cane was grown. For example, in the 1790s Lieutenant J. Paterson, of the Bengal Presidency promoted to the British parliament the idea that sugar cane could grow in British India, where it had started, with many advantages and at less expense than in the West Indies. As a result, sugar factories were established in Bihar in eastern India.
During the Napoleonic Wars, sugar-beet production increased in continental Europe because of the difficulty of importing sugar when shipping was subject to blockade. By 1880 the sugar beet was the main source of sugar in Europe. It was also cultivated in Lincolnshire and other parts of England, although the United Kingdom continued to import the main part of its sugar from its colonies.

Until the late nineteenth century, sugar was purchased in loaves, which had to be cut using implements called sugar nips. In later years, granulated sugar was more usually sold in bags. Sugar cubes were produced in the nineteenth century. The first inventor of a process to produce sugar in cube form was Jakob Christof Rad, director of a sugar refinery in Dačice. In 1841, he produced the first sugar cube in the world. He began sugar-cube production after being granted a five-year patent for the process on 23 January 1843. Henry Tate of Tate & Lyle was another early manufacturer of sugar cubes at his refineries in Liverpool and London. Tate purchased a patent for sugar-cube manufacture from German Eugen Langen, who in 1872 had invented a different method of processing of sugar cubes.

Sugar was rationed during World War I, though it was said that "No previous war in history has been fought so largely on sugar and so little on alcohol",  and more sharply during World War II. Rationing led to the development and use of various artificial sweeteners.

Chemistry

Scientifically, sugar loosely refers to a number of carbohydrates, such as monosaccharides, disaccharides, or oligosaccharides. Monosaccharides are also called "simple sugars", the most important being glucose. Glucose has the molecular formula . The names of typical sugars end with -ose, as in "glucose" and "fructose". Sometimes such words may also refer to any types of carbohydrates soluble in water. The acyclic mono- and disaccharides contain either aldehyde groups or ketone groups. These carbon-oxygen double bonds (C=O) are the reactive centers. All saccharides with more than one ring in their structure result from two or more monosaccharides joined by glycosidic bonds with the resultant loss of a molecule of water per bond.

Monosaccharides in a closed-chain form can form glycosidic bonds with other monosaccharides, creating disaccharides (such as sucrose) and polysaccharides (such as starch or cellulose). Enzymes must hydrolyze or otherwise break these glycosidic bonds before such compounds become metabolized. After digestion and absorption the principal monosaccharides present in the blood and internal tissues include glucose, fructose, and galactose. Many pentoses and hexoses can form ring structures. In these closed-chain forms, the aldehyde or ketone group remains non-free, so many of the reactions typical of these groups cannot occur. Glucose in solution exists mostly in the ring form at equilibrium, with less than 0.1% of the molecules in the open-chain form.

In November 2019, scientists reported detecting, for the first time, sugar molecules, including ribose, in meteorites, suggesting that chemical processes on asteroids can produce some fundamentally essential bio-ingredients important to life, and supporting the notion of an RNA World prior to a DNA-based origin of life on Earth, and possibly, as well, the notion of panspermia.

Natural polymers
Biopolymers of sugars are common in nature. Through photosynthesis, plants produce glyceraldehyde-3-phosphate (G3P), a phosphated 3-carbon sugar that is used by the cell to make monosaccharides such as glucose or (as in cane and beet) sucrose. Monosaccharides may be further converted into structural polysaccharides such as cellulose and pectin for cell wall construction or into energy reserves in the form of storage polysaccharides such as starch or inulin. Starch, consisting of two different polymers of glucose, is a readily degradable form of chemical energy stored by cells, and can be converted to other types of energy. Another polymer of glucose is cellulose, which is a linear chain composed of several hundred or thousand glucose units. It is used by plants as a structural component in their cell walls. Humans can digest cellulose only to a very limited extent, though ruminants can do so with the help of symbiotic bacteria in their gut. DNA and RNA are built up of the monosaccharides deoxyribose and ribose, respectively. Deoxyribose has the formula  and ribose the formula .

Flammability and heat response

Because sugars burn easily when exposed to flame, the handling of sugars risks dust explosion. The risk of explosion is higher when the sugar has been milled to superfine texture, such as for use in chewing gum. The 2008 Georgia sugar refinery explosion, which killed 14 people and injured 36, and destroyed most of the refinery, was caused by the ignition of sugar dust.

In its culinary use, exposing sugar to heat causes caramelization. As the process occurs, volatile chemicals such as diacetyl are released, producing the characteristic caramel flavor.

Types

Monosaccharides
Fructose, galactose, and glucose are all simple sugars, monosaccharides, with the general formula C6H12O6. They have five hydroxyl groups (−OH) and a carbonyl group (C=O) and are cyclic when dissolved in water. They each exist as several isomers with dextro- and laevo-rotatory forms that cause polarized light to diverge to the right or the left.
 Fructose, or fruit sugar, occurs naturally in fruits, some root vegetables, cane sugar and honey and is the sweetest of the sugars. It is one of the components of sucrose or table sugar. It is used as a high-fructose syrup, which is manufactured from hydrolyzed corn starch that has been processed to yield corn syrup, with enzymes then added to convert part of the glucose into fructose.
 Galactose generally does not occur in the free state but is a constituent with glucose of the disaccharide lactose or milk sugar. It is less sweet than glucose. It is a component of the antigens found on the surface of red blood cells that determine blood groups.
 Glucose occurs naturally in fruits and plant juices and is the primary product of photosynthesis. Starch is converted into glucose during digestion, and glucose is the form of sugar that is transported around the bodies of animals in the bloodstream. Although in principle there are two enantiomers of glucose (mirror images one of the other), naturally occurring glucose is D-glucose. This is also called dextrose, or grape sugar because drying grape juice produces crystals of dextrose that can be sieved from the other components. Glucose syrup is a liquid form of glucose that is widely used in the manufacture of foodstuffs. It can be manufactured from starch by enzymatic hydrolysis. For example, corn syrup, which is produced commercially by breaking down maize starch, is one common source of purified dextrose. However, dextrose is naturally present in many unprocessed, whole foods, including honey and fruits such as grapes.

Disaccharides
Lactose, maltose, and sucrose are all compound sugars, disaccharides, with the general formula C12H22O11. They are formed by the combination of two monosaccharide molecules with the exclusion of a molecule of water.
 Lactose is the naturally occurring sugar found in milk. A molecule of lactose is formed by the combination of a molecule of galactose with a molecule of glucose. It is broken down when consumed into its constituent parts by the enzyme lactase during digestion. Children have this enzyme but some adults no longer form it and they are unable to digest lactose.
 Maltose is formed during the germination of certain grains, the most notable being barley, which is converted into malt, the source of the sugar's name. A molecule of maltose is formed by the combination of two molecules of glucose. It is less sweet than glucose, fructose or sucrose. It is formed in the body during the digestion of starch by the enzyme amylase and is itself broken down during digestion by the enzyme maltase.
 Sucrose is found in the stems of sugarcane and roots of sugar beet. It also occurs naturally alongside fructose and glucose in other plants, in particular fruits and some roots such as carrots. The different proportions of sugars found in these foods determines the range of sweetness experienced when eating them. A molecule of sucrose is formed by the combination of a molecule of glucose with a molecule of fructose. After being eaten, sucrose is split into its constituent parts during digestion by a number of enzymes known as sucrases.

Sources
The sugar contents of common fruits and vegetables are presented in Table 1.

  The carbohydrate figure is calculated in the USDA database and does not always correspond to the sum of the sugars, the starch, and the dietary fiber.
  The fructose to fructose plus glucose ratio is calculated by including the fructose and glucose coming from the sucrose.

Production

Due to rising demand, sugar production in general increased some 14% over the period 2009 to 2018. The largest importers were China, Indonesia, and the United States.

Sugarcane

Global production of sugarcane in 2020 was 1.9 billion tonnes, with Brazil producing 40% of the world total and India 20% (table).

Sugarcane refers to any of several species, or their hybrids, of giant grasses in the genus Saccharum in the family Poaceae. They have been cultivated in tropical climates in the Indian subcontinent and Southeast Asia over centuries for the sucrose found in their stems. A great expansion in sugarcane production took place in the 18th century with the establishment of slave plantations in the Americas. The use of slavery for the labor-intensive process resulted in sugar production, enabling prices cheap enough for most people to buy. Mechanization reduced some labor needs, but in the 21st century, cultivation and production relied on low-wage laborers.

Sugar cane requires a frost-free climate with sufficient rainfall during the growing season to make full use of the plant's substantial growth potential. The crop is harvested mechanically or by hand, chopped into lengths and conveyed rapidly to the processing plant (commonly known as a sugar mill) where it is either milled and the juice extracted with water or extracted by diffusion. The juice is clarified with lime and heated to destroy enzymes. The resulting thin syrup is concentrated in a series of evaporators, after which further water is removed. The resulting supersaturated solution is seeded with sugar crystals, facilitating crystal formation and drying. Molasses is a by-product of the process and the fiber from the stems, known as bagasse, is burned to provide energy for the sugar extraction process. The crystals of raw sugar have a sticky brown coating and either can be used as they are, can be bleached by sulfur dioxide, or can be treated in a carbonatation process to produce a whiter product. About  of irrigation water is needed for every  of sugar produced.

Sugar beet

In 2020, global production of sugar beets was 253 million tonnes, led by Russia with 13% of the world total (table).

The sugar beet became a major source of sugar in the 19th century when methods for extracting the sugar became available. It is a biennial plant, a cultivated variety of Beta vulgaris in the family Amaranthaceae, the tuberous root of which contains a high proportion of sucrose. It is cultivated as a root crop in temperate regions with adequate rainfall and requires a fertile soil. The crop is harvested mechanically in the autumn and the crown of leaves and excess soil removed. The roots do not deteriorate rapidly and may be left in the field for some weeks before being transported to the processing plant where the crop is washed and sliced, and the sugar extracted by diffusion. Milk of lime is added to the raw juice with calcium carbonate. After water is evaporated by boiling the syrup under a vacuum, the syrup is cooled and seeded with sugar crystals. The white sugar that crystallizes can be separated in a centrifuge and dried, requiring no further refining.

Refining

Refined sugar is made from raw sugar that has undergone a refining process to remove the molasses. Raw sugar is sucrose which is extracted from sugarcane or sugar beet. While raw sugar can be consumed, the refining process removes unwanted tastes and results in refined sugar or white sugar.

The sugar may be transported in bulk to the country where it will be used and the refining process often takes place there. The first stage is known as affination and involves immersing the sugar crystals in a concentrated syrup that softens and removes the sticky brown coating without dissolving them. The crystals are then separated from the liquor and dissolved in water. The resulting syrup is treated either by a carbonatation or by a phosphatation process. Both involve the precipitation of a fine solid in the syrup and when this is filtered out, many of the impurities are removed at the same time. Removal of color is achieved by using either a granular activated carbon or an ion-exchange resin. The sugar syrup is concentrated by boiling and then cooled and seeded with sugar crystals, causing the sugar to crystallize out. The liquor is spun off in a centrifuge and the white crystals are dried in hot air and ready to be packaged or used. The surplus liquor is made into refiners' molasses.

The International Commission for Uniform Methods of Sugar Analysis sets standards for the measurement of the purity of refined sugar, known as ICUMSA numbers; lower numbers indicate a higher level of purity in the refined sugar.

Refined sugar is widely used for industrial needs for higher quality. Refined sugar is purer (ICUMSA below 300) than raw sugar (ICUMSA over 1,500). The level of purity associated with the colors of sugar, expressed by standard number ICUMSA, the smaller ICUMSA numbers indicate the higher purity of sugar.

Forms and uses

Crystal size

 Coarse-grain sugar, also known as sanding sugar, composed of reflective crystals with grain size of about 1 to 3 mm, similar to kitchen salt. Used atop baked products and candies, it will not dissolve when subjected to heat and moisture.
 Granulated sugar (about 0.6 mm crystals), also known as table sugar or regular sugar, is used at the table, to sprinkle on foods and to sweeten hot drinks (coffee and tea), and in home baking to add sweetness and texture to baked products (cookies and cakes) and desserts (pudding and ice cream). It is also used as a preservative to prevent micro-organisms from growing and perishable food from spoiling, as in candied fruits, jams, and marmalades.
 Milled sugars are ground to a fine powder. They are used for dusting foods and in baking and confectionery.
 Caster sugar, sold as "superfine" sugar in the United States, with grain size of about 0.35 mm
 Powdered sugar, also known as confectioner's sugar or icing sugar, available in varying degrees of fineness (e.g., fine powdered or 3X, very fine or 6X, and ultra-fine or 10X). The ultra-fine variety (sometimes called 10X) has grain size of about 0.060 mm, that is about ten times smaller than granulated sugar.
 Snow powder, a non-melting form of powdered sugar usually consisting of glucose, rather than sucrose. 
 Screened sugars are crystalline products separated according to the size of the grains. They are used for decorative table sugars, for blending in dry mixes and in baking and confectionery.

Shapes

Sugar cubes (sometimes called sugar lumps) are white or brown granulated sugars lightly steamed and pressed together in block shape. They are used to sweeten drinks.
Sugarloaf was the usual cone-form in which refined sugar was produced and sold until the late 19th century. This shape is still in use in Germany (for preparation of Feuerzangenbowle) as well as Iran and Morocco.

Brown sugars

Brown sugars are granulated sugars, either containing residual molasses, or with the grains deliberately coated with molasses to produce a light- or dark-colored sugar. They are used in baked goods, confectionery, and toffees. Their darkness is due to the amount of molasses they contain. They may be classified based on their darkness or country of origin. For instance:
 Light brown, with little content of molasses (about 3.5%)
 Dark brown, with higher content of molasses (about 6.5%)
 Non-centrifugal cane sugar, unrefined and hence very dark cane sugar obtained by evaporating water from sugarcane juice, such as:
 Panela, also known as rapadura, chancaca, piloncillo.
 Some varieties of muscovado, also known as Barbados sugar. Other varieties are partially refined by centrifugation or by using a spray dryer.
 Some varieties of jaggery. Other varieties are produced from date fruits or from palm sap, rather than sugarcane juice.

Liquid sugars

 Honey, mainly containing unbound molecules of fructose and glucose, is a viscous liquid produced by bees by digesting floral nectar.
 Syrups are thick, viscous liquids consisting primarily of a solution of sugar in water. They are used in the food processing of a wide range of products including beverages, hard candy, ice cream, and jams.
 Syrups made by dissolving granulated sugar in water are sometimes referred to as liquid sugar. A liquid sugar containing 50% sugar and 50% water is called simple syrup.
 Syrups can also be made by reducing naturally sweet juices such as cane juice, or maple sap. 
 Corn syrup is made by converting corn starch to sugars (mainly maltose and glucose).
 High-fructose corn syrup (HFCS), is produced by further processing corn syrup to convert some of its glucose into fructose.
 Inverted sugar syrup, commonly known as invert syrup or invert sugar, is a mixture of two simple sugars—glucose and fructose—that is made by heating granulated sugar in water. It is used in breads, cakes, and beverages for adjusting sweetness, aiding moisture retention and avoiding crystallization of sugars.
 Molasses and treacle are obtained by removing sugar from sugarcane or sugar beet juice, as a byproduct of sugar production. They may be blended with the above-mentioned syrups to enhance sweetness and used in a range of baked goods and confectionery including toffees and licorice. 
 Blackstrap molasses, also known as black treacle, has dark color, relatively small sugar content and strong flavour. It is sometimes added to animal feed, or processed to produce rum, or ethanol for fuel.
 Regular molasses and golden syrup treacle have higher sugar content and lighter color, relative to blackstrap.
 In winemaking, fruit sugars are converted into alcohol by a fermentation process. If the must formed by pressing the fruit has a low sugar content, additional sugar may be added to raise the alcohol content of the wine in a process called chaptalization. In the production of sweet wines, fermentation may be halted before it has run its full course, leaving behind some residual sugar that gives the wine its sweet taste.

Other sweeteners
 Low-calorie sweeteners are often made of maltodextrin with added sweeteners. Maltodextrin is an easily digestible synthetic polysaccharide consisting of short chains of three or more glucose molecules and is made by the partial hydrolysis of starch. Strictly, maltodextrin is not classified as sugar as it contains more than two glucose molecules, although its structure is similar to maltose, a molecule composed of two joined glucose molecules.
 Polyols are sugar alcohols and are used in chewing gums where a sweet flavor is required that lasts for a prolonged time in the mouth.
 Several different kinds of zero-calorie artificial sweeteners may be also used as sugar substitutes.

Consumption
In most parts of the world, sugar is an important part of the human diet, making food more palatable and providing food energy. After cereals and vegetable oils, sugar derived from sugarcane and beet provided more kilocalories per capita per day on average than other food groups. In 1750 the average Briton got 72 calories a day from sugar. In 1913 this had risen to 395. In 2015 it still provided around 14% of the calories in British diets. According to one source, per capita consumption of sugar in 2016 was highest in the United States, followed by Germany and the Netherlands.

Nutrition and flavor

Brown and white granulated sugar are 97% to nearly 100% carbohydrates, respectively, with less than 2% water, and no dietary fiber, protein or fat (table). Brown sugar contains a moderate amount of iron (15% of the Reference Daily Intake in a 100 gram amount, see table), but a typical serving of 4 grams (one teaspoon), would provide 15 calories and a negligible amount of iron or any other nutrient. Because brown sugar contains 5–10% molasses reintroduced during processing, its value to some consumers is a richer flavor than white sugar.

Health effects

Sugar industry funding and health information

Sugar refiners and manufacturers of sugary foods and drinks have sought to influence medical research and public health recommendations, with substantial and largely clandestine spending documented from the 1960s to 2016. The results of research on the health effects of sugary food and drink differ significantly, depending on whether the researcher has financial ties to the food and drink industry. A 2013 medical review concluded that "unhealthy commodity industries should have no role in the formation of national or international NCD [non-communicable disease] policy".

There have been similar efforts to steer coverage of sugar-related health information in popular media, including news media and social media.

Obesity and metabolic syndrome

A 2003 technical report by the World Health Organization (WHO) provides evidence that high intake of sugary drinks (including fruit juice) increases the risk of obesity by adding to overall energy intake. By itself, sugar is not a factor causing obesity and metabolic syndrome, but rather – when over-consumed – is a component of unhealthy dietary behavior. Meta-analyses showed that excessive consumption of sugar-sweetened beverages increased the risk of developing type 2 diabetes and metabolic syndrome – including weight gain and obesity – in adults and children.

Hyperactivity
A 2019 meta-analysis found that sugar consumption does not improve mood, but can lower alertness and increase fatigue within an hour of consumption. Some studies report evidence of causality between high consumption of refined sugar and hyperactivity. One review of low-quality studies of children consuming high amounts of energy drinks showed association with higher rates of unhealthy behaviors, including smoking and excessive alcohol use, and with hyperactivity and insomnia, although such effects could not be specifically attributed to sugar over other components of those drinks such as caffeine.

Tooth decay
The 2003 WHO report stated that "Sugars are undoubtedly the most important dietary factor in the development of dental caries". A review of human studies showed that the incidence of caries is lower when sugar intake is less than 10% of total energy consumed.

Nutritional displacement
The "empty calories" argument states that a diet high in added (or 'free') sugars will reduce consumption of foods that contain essential nutrients. This nutrient displacement occurs if sugar makes up more than 25% of daily energy intake, a proportion associated with poor diet quality and risk of obesity. Displacement may occur at lower levels of consumption.

Recommended dietary intake
The WHO recommends that both adults and children reduce the intake of free sugars to less than 10% of total energy intake, and suggests a reduction to below 5%. "Free sugars" include monosaccharides and disaccharides added to foods, and sugars found in fruit juice and concentrates, as well as in honey and syrups. According to the WHO, "[t]hese recommendations were based on the totality of available evidence reviewed regarding the relationship between free sugars intake and body weight (low and moderate quality evidence) and dental caries (very low and moderate quality evidence)."

On 20 May 2016, the U.S. Food and Drug Administration announced changes to the Nutrition Facts panel displayed on all foods, to be effective by July 2018. New to the panel is a requirement to list "added sugars" by weight and as a percent of Daily Value (DV). For vitamins and minerals, the intent of DVs is to indicate how much should be consumed. For added sugars, the guidance is that 100% DV should not be exceeded. 100% DV is defined as 50 grams. For a person consuming 2000 calories a day, 50 grams is equal to 200 calories and thus 10% of total calories—the same guidance as the WHO. To put this in context, most 355 mL (12 US fl oz) cans of soda contain 39 grams of sugar. In the United States, a government survey on food consumption in 2013–2014 reported that, for men and women aged 20 and older, the average total sugar intakes—naturally occurring in foods and added—were, respectively, 125 and 99 g/day.

Measurements
Various culinary sugars have different densities due to differences in particle size and inclusion of moisture.

Domino Sugar gives the following weight to volume conversions (in United States customary units):
 Firmly packed brown sugar 1 lb = 2.5 cups (or 1.3 L per kg, 0.77 kg/L)
 Granulated sugar 1 lb = 2.25 cups (or 1.17 L per kg, 0.85 kg/L)
 Unsifted confectioner's sugar 1 lb = 3.75 cups (or 2.0 L per kg, 0.5 kg/L)

The "Engineering Resources – Bulk Density Chart" published in Powder and Bulk gives different values for the bulk densities:
 Beet sugar 0.80 g/mL
 Dextrose sugar 0.62 g/mL ( = 620 kg/m^3)
 Granulated sugar 0.70 g/mL
 Powdered sugar 0.56 g/mL

Society and culture
Manufacturers of sugary products, such as soft drinks and candy, and the Sugar Research Foundation have been accused of trying to influence consumers and medical associations in the 1960s and 1970s by creating doubt about the potential health hazards of sucrose overconsumption, while promoting saturated fat as the main dietary risk factor in cardiovascular diseases. In 2016, the criticism led to recommendations that diet policymakers emphasize the need for high-quality research that accounts for multiple biomarkers on development of cardiovascular diseases.

Gallery

See also

 Barley sugar
 Holing cane
 List of unrefined sweeteners
 Rare sugar
 Sugar plantations in the Caribbean
 Glycomics

References

Further reading
 
 
 Frankopan, Peter, The Silk Roads: A New History of the World, 2016, Bloomsbury, 
 
 Strong, Roy (2002), Feast: A History of Grand Eating, Jonathan Cape,

External links

Sugar at the National Health Service

 
Carbohydrates
Excipients
Indian inventions